The 2013 Grand Rapids flood lasted from April 12 to 25, 2013, affecting multiple areas in the Grand Rapids metropolitan area. The flooding caused thousands of residents in the area to evacuate their homes.

Meteorology
 

In April 2013, heavy rain throughout the Midwest caused severe flooding in the region.

EDT.

A storm deemed "catastrophic" that had the potential to drop  of rain had also barely missed the Grand Rapids area on the day that the water crested in the Grand River.

Impact

On April 21, Mayor of Grand Rapids, George Heartwell, declared a state of emergency. Evacuations of homes were reported along with some reports about boat rescues from houses in the area. In Kent County, about 700 people were evacuated while 1,000 people alone were evacuated from the Plaza Towers in downtown Grand Rapids. Some buildings in Grand Rapids near the riverfront had the Grand River's waterline go over their windows with some individuals able to see fish and ducks swim by through the windows.

Flood walls and bridges in Grand Rapids caused some increased flooding in cities up and downstream from the Grand River since they impeded the flow of the river, causing water to stand and rise. Wastewater treatment plants in Grand Rapids, Grandville and Wyoming had partially treated wastewater overflow from their facilities.

Response

The American Red Cross of West Michigan deployed to heavily affected neighborhoods in the area. They also opened multiple shelters for people who had to evacuate their homes due to the rising waters. Shelters were opened at the Kentwood Activities Center in Grand Rapids, Alpine Baptist Church in Comstock Park, and the First Baptist Church in Lowell. Shelters also opened in Ionia County at the Ionia Armory Community Center; Ottawa County at the Hudsonville Congregation United Church of Christ; and Newaygo County at the TrueNorth Community Services building.  During the floods, thousands of residents in the Grand Rapids area volunteered to fill over 100,000 sand bags that were to be used throughout the territory. Near the Grand Rapids wastewater facility, a  wall of sandbags were placed. CSX Transportation also placed train cars full of salt on a 110-year-old trestle bridge that crossed the river near Wealthy Street in order to weigh down the bridge from the rising floodwaters below it.

Aftermath
The state of emergency declared by Mayor Heartwell lasted until May 24 in order to give more time for officials to gather information about the impact of the flooding.

Following the flooding, thousands of sandbags had to be removed with some possibly being stored for future use for other floods. Discussions were also held on whether to turn the wall of sandbags near the Grand Rapids wastewater facility into a permanent berm for future protection.

In the spring of 2014, Grand Rapids and Walker started a $703,000 contract to install flap gates and to perform repairs to existing flood walls. In August 2014, Grand Rapids also released plans to remove obstructions in the Grand River and to raise the berm near their wastewater plant. After initial claims by Grand Rapids officials that the flood walls in the city were adequate, in November 2014, city officials decided to look at ways to heighten flood walls due to factors involving Federal Emergency Management Agency, climate change and a proposed river restoration project.

References

Grand Rapids flood
2013 in Michigan
Floods in the United States
Grand Rapids metropolitan area